The Calgary Peace Prize is an annual Canadian award that is given by Mount Royal University.

The purpose of the award is to recognize individuals globally for their work supporting peace, "making the world a more just, safer and less violent place."

History 
The University of Calgary established the Calgary Peace Prize in 2006. The coordination of it shifted to Mount Royal University in 2016 during the creation of the John de Chastelain Peace Initiative. The prize is $8,000 and is awarded annually in April.

As of 2019, Mark Ayyash, who serves as the director of the Initiative, oversees the prize.

Selection criteria 
The award is given only to someone with a who has made a lifelong commitment to peace. Anyone can nominate someone. The winner is selected by a six-person committee of people from Calgary.

Winners

See also
 List of peace prizes

References 

Awards established in 2006
Peace awards
Canadian awards